Hebraization may refer to:

Hebraization of Palestinian place names
Hebraization of surnames
Hebraization of English